Halil Özşan (born 26 October 1976) is a Turkish Cypriot-born actor, screenwriter and producer. As an actor, he came to prominence for his role as Todd Carr in Dawson's Creek. He has gone on to appear in various series regular and recurring roles on shows such as  Jessica Jones, The Blacklist, Graceland, Impastor, 90210, and Kyle XY.

As a screenwriter and producer, he is known for being co-executive producer and co-writer of the Viceland comedy What Would Diplo Do? starring his Dawson's Creek co-star James Van Der Beek.

Ozsan fronted the band Poets and Pornstars as a singer-songwriter until 2008, with his music featured in such media as Californication and So You Think You Can Dance.

Early life
Ozsan was born to Turkish Cypriot parents in Famagusta, Cyprus. At the age of three, he moved to England with his family and was raised in the London suburb of Havering. At the age of 11, he gained admission to Brentwood School, receiving a distinction for drama.

Career 
Ozsan moved to the United States in the 1990s, where he began working in films and television. His first major recognition for a recurring role was as Todd Carr in Dawson's Creek, followed by a main role in the miniseries Fallen and a recurring role in Kyle XY. Ozsan's first film appearance was in the film S1m0ne. He was the singer-songwriter for the rock band Poets and Pornstars; in 2008, he left the band to return to acting full-time. His songs have appeared in several films and television shows, including Californication, So You Think You Can Dance, Little Athens and Undead or Alive. Many other television shows and films were to follow.

In 2017, he became the co-executive producer and co-writer of the critically acclaimed Viceland comedy series What Would Diplo Do?, reuniting with his Dawson's Creek co-star James Van Der Beek.

Personal life 
On 16 October 2020, Ozsan eloped with makeup artist and hair stylist Ashley Kucich.

Filmography

References

External links
 
 

1976 births
20th-century English male actors
English male film actors
English male television actors
English male singer-songwriters
Living people
People educated at Brentwood School, Essex
People from Famagusta
English male video game actors
Cypriot male video game actors
English male web series actors
People from the London Borough of Havering
Cypriot emigrants to England
Cypriot emigrants to the United States
21st-century British male singers
English emigrants to the United States